Nnamdi Azikiwe University, Awka, also called UNIZIK or NAU in short is a federal university in Nigeria. It consists of two campuses in Anambra State. Its main campus is in Awka (the capital of Anambra State), while its other campus is in Nnewi. There are also other campuses of Nnamdi Azikiwe University, Awka. These include Agulu in Aniocha local government area and Ifite-Ogwuari in Ayamelum local government area in Anambra State. This makes Nnamdi Azikiwe University to operate in the three Senatorial Districts in Anambra State, Nigeria having Awka campus, in Anambra Central Senatorial District, Nnewi in Anambra North Senatorial District and Ifite-Ogwuari in Anambra North Senatorial District, respectively. These campuses have libraries and information services that serve the students, academic and non-academic staff. It is one of the federal universities which are overseen and accredited by the National Universities Commission. The university is named after late Dr. Nnamdi Azikiwe. The academic staff of the university belong to Academic Staff Union of Universities (ASUU). The staff union is known to grant scholarship to indigent students just like other philanthropists. It has a total population of about 34,000 students.

History 

Nnamdi Azikiwe University came into being as an offshoot of the defunct Anambra State University of Technology (ASUTECH). ASUTECH which was established through Law No. 7 of 30 July 1980 by the Government of the old Anambra that operated as a multi-campus university, with campuses in Abakiliki, Enugu, Awka and Nnewi.
In 1991, following the split of the old Anambra State into Anambra and Enugu States, the Awka and Nnewi campuses of the former ASUTECH were constituted into Nnamdi Azikiwe University by the Anambra State Edict No.5 26 November 1991. Nnamdi Azikiwe University was taken over by the Federal Government by Decree No. 34 on 15 July 1992.

In 1991, after the former Anambra State was split into Anambra and Enugu States, the Awka and Nnewi campuses of the former Anambra State University of Technology (ASUTECH) were combined into Nnamdi Azikiwe University, which was later taken over by Federal government. The university is named after Dr. Nnamdi Azikiwe, the first president of Nigeria. The Awka Campus became Nnamdi Azikiwe University. In 1992, the Federal Government of Nigeria took over the university from Anambra State. Nnamdi Azikiwe University, thus, became a Federal University.

Location  

The main campus of the university is located along Onitsha – Enugu Expressway, Awka, while the second campus is at Nnewi (NAUTH and Okofia) and the third campus is at Agulu (Faculty of Pharmacy).

Library 
The University Library in Nnamdi Azikiwe University, Awka, Nigeria is named - Professor Festus Aghagbo Nwako Library. It is located on the main campus at the permanent site in Awka, the capital of Anambra State. However, there are libraries on the other campuses in Nnewi and Agulu. These libraries are managed by librarians and have internet availability and accessibility. They have the sole responsibility of making information resources and facilities accessible to the students, staff, other institutions, and all the members of the academic community. The University library facilities are used for other activities by members of the academic community like cultural festivals.  In 2020, the Vice Chancellor of Nnamdi Azikiwe University, Professor Charles Esimone upgraded the internet bandwidth to internet 3-STM-1 which improved the library and information access in Awka campus, Agulu campus and Nnewi Teaching hospital, respectively. 

The Medical Library in Nnewi Campus is for the College of Health Sciences of Nnamdi Azikiwe University, Awka. It is a connection of three libraries which are the Main Library the Nnamdi Azikiwe University Teaching Hospital, Nnewi, the Pre-Clinical Campus at Okofia also in Nnewi and the Diagnostic and Healthcare Centre at Neni in Anaocha Local Government Area of Anambra State. 

The medical library started operations with a small collection in 1986 when it was formerly Anambra State University of Technology (ASUTECH) before the creation of the new Anambra State in 1991. It became a full medical library that serve medical students, teaching staff, medical and paramedical personnel, and other health practitioners in 1992 in a temporary building. The library was relocated in the year 2000 to a Medical Library Complex in the teaching hospital. Then, it had18,547 books and 568 journal titles which provided literature and other information-related resources. 

The library creates awareness, provides physical and e-resources and services to the users. There are also provision of current awareness services, references, databases, reprographic services, Selective Dissemination of Information, Document Delivery Services, online customer services and document delivery services. The Medical Library of Nnamdi Azikiwe University, Awka has benefitted from individuals and organizations who donated information resources. These have increased the collection of medical libraries. 

The libraries in Nnamdi Azikiwe University in Awka, Nnew and Agulu still face challenges in delivering effective and efficient services. These include, difficulty in accessing resources, computer hanging, erratic power supply, inadequate financial support and low ICT literacy.

Academic Staff Union of Universities (ASUU) 
ASUU is the umbrella that holds all the academic staff in the government universities in Nigeria. It has influence over the tertiary educational system in Nigeria. However, the Unizik Chapter of the Academic Union of Universities (ASUU) has been impacting indigent students' lives in ensuring that those students do not drop out of school. In 2019/2020 academic session, 30 indigent students of the Nnamdi Azikiwe University, Awka, Anambra State, were selected from different faculties in the university. They benefited from N1.5million scholarship awards by the members of Academic Staff Union of Universities (ASUU) of the institution. Each beneficiary was given N50,000 each to help in sustaining them in the institution. The ASUU NAU branch was revived in 2012. Prof Ike Odimegwu was the first ASUU NAU branch chairman after the inauguration in 2012.

Notable alumni
 

Ijeoma Grace Agu, Nigerian actress.
Rita Edochie, Nigerian veteran actress.
Uche Ekwunife, Nigerian politician.
Ochuko Emuakpeje Nigerian chess player
Destiny Etiko, Nigerian actress.
Mike Ezuruonye, Nigerian actor., Professor of Laws
Ebube Nwagbo, Nigerian actress
Queen Nwokoye, Nigerian actress
Oge Okoye, Nigerian actress
Francisca Oladipo, Nigerian computer scientist
Rita Orji, Nigerian-Canadian Professor, Canada Research Chair, Top 150 Canadian Women in Science, Technology, Engineering, and Mathematics (STEM)., Member of Royal Society of Canada, Member of Global Young Academy, Top 100 Canada's Most Powerful Women

Faculties and population 

The university has a population of 24,706 for the regular students and 12,476 students for the part-time programme' students during the 2004/2005 academic year.

UNIZIK has a total of 14 faculties and 57 departments. The university has the following faculties:
1. Faculty of Agriculture: 3000 students
2. Faculty of Arts: 3000 students 
3. Faculty of Basic Medical Sciences: 2000 students 
4. Faculty of Biosciences
5. Faculty of Education: 5000 students 
6. Faculty of Engineering: 4000 students
7. Faculty of Environmental Sciences
8. Faculty of Health Sciences and Technology
9. Faculty of Law: 2000 students 
10. Faculty of Management Sciences
11. Faculty of Medicine
12. Faculty of Pharmaceutical Sciences
13. Faculty of Physical Sciences
14. Faculty of Social Sciences: 3000 students

References

External links
 

 
Universities and colleges in Nigeria
Education in Anambra State
Educational institutions established in 1991
Public universities in Nigeria
1991 establishments in Nigeria